C2orf72 (Chromosome 2, Open Reading Frame 72) is a gene in humans (Homo sapiens) that encodes a protein currently named after its gene, C2orf72. It is also designated LOC257407 and can be found under GenBank accession code NM_001144994.2. The protein can be found under UniProt accession code A6NCS6.

This gene is primarily expressed in the liver, brain, placental, and small intestine tissues. C2orf72 is an intracellular protein that has been predicted to reside within the nucleus, cytosol, and plasma membrane of cells.  The function of C2orf72 is unknown, but it is predicted to be involved in very-low-density lipoprotein particle assembly and also involved in the regulation of cholesterol esterification. This prediction also matches with the fact that both estradiol and testosterone have been reported to upregulate expression of C2orf72.

Gene

Locus 
C2orf72 is a protein-coding gene found on the forward (+) strand of chromosome 2 at the locus 2q37.1, on the long arm of the chromosome.

mRNA 
C2orf72's mRNA transcript is reported to be about 3,629 base pairs long. It appears to have two polyadenylation sites near the 5′ end of the mRNA transcript, each preceded by their respective regulatory sequences, such as ATTAAA or AATAAA.

There are three predicted exons reported for human C2orf72.

Expression pattern 
C2orf72 is preferentially expressed in brain, liver, placenta, colon, small intestine, gallbladder, stomach, and prostate, and to a lesser extent in adrenal gland, appendix, pancreas, lung, kidney, testis, and urinary bladder.

Predicted Biological Functions 

It is predicted via Archs4 (July 16, 2022) that the function of this gene may be related to very-low-density lipoprotein particle assembly and also involved in the regulation of cholesterol esterification.

Regulation

Gene-level regulation

Gene perturbation data 
In a study of embryonic liver samples lacking hepatocyte nuclear factor 4 alpha (HNF4α), the expression of C2orf72 was downregulated.

Both estradiol and testosterone upregulate expression of C2orf72.

Expression pattern 
C2orf72 mRNA and protein products are found preferentially in the liver, kidney, and placenta. The protein is localized to the cell membrane and cytoplasm in liver, brain, and placental tissues.

Transcript-level regulation 
miR-1271-5p is a microRNA that could bind to the 3′ untranslated region of the C2orf72 mRNA transcript at 5′-...GUGCCAA...-3′.

Protein-level regulation

Predicted phosphorylation sites 
There are at least two predicted phosphorylation sites for the human C2orf72 protein, one at threonine-286 and the other at serine-294.

Protein

Human protein 
The predicted molecular weight of C2orf72 is 30.5 kDa, and it has a predicted isoelectric point (pI) of pH 8.7.

There are eight cysteine residues, for a potential of four disulfide bonds. Most of the cysteine residues are positioned next to a polar amino acid (uncharged or positively or negatively charged).

At physiological pH, there are 33 positively charged amino acid residues, including histidine, most of which are arginines. Likewise, there are 33 negatively charged amino acid residues, most of which are glutamates.

There are 14 hydroxyl-containing residues (tyrosine, threonine or serine) that could serve as typical phosphorylation sites; most of these are serines.

Interacting proteins 
These proteins have been reported to interact with human C2orf72: RASN (GTPase NRas), RASK (GTPase KRas), and CD81.

Homology 
There are at least 203 organisms with an ortholog of C2orf72. The most evolutionarily distant reported ortholog of C2orf72 is in the Australian ghost shark (Callorhincus milii);, and it is broadly conserved from Actinopterygii (bony fish) to Mammalia.

References 

Genes
Lipids
Cholesterol and steroid metabolism disorders